The 2013 Florida Gators softball team represented the University of Florida softball program for the 2013 NCAA softball season.

Roster
The 2013 Florida Gators softball team has 2 seniors, 2 juniors, 6 sophomores, and 6 freshmen.

References

Florida Gators softball seasons
2013 in sports in Florida
2013 Southeastern Conference softball season
Florida
Women's College World Series seasons